Peringottukurissi-I is a village in the Palakkad district, state of Kerala, India. It is among the villages administered by the Peringottukurissi gram panchayat.

Demographics
 India census, Peringottukurissi-I had a population of 11,482 with 5,562 males and 5,920 females.

References

Villages in Palakkad district